Nineveh is a community in the Canadian province of Nova Scotia, located in the Lunenburg Municipal District in Lunenburg County. It was named for the ancient city of Nineveh.

References

External links
Nineveh on Destination Nova Scotia

Communities in Lunenburg County, Nova Scotia
General Service Areas in Nova Scotia